This was the original Haddiscoe railway station serving Haddiscoe, Norfolk. It was opened in 1847 by the Norfolk Railway and closed in 1904. Upon closure it was replaced by Haddiscoe Low Level railway station which was later renamed Haddiscoe railway station and remains open.

There was also a station nearby on a higher level known as Herringfleet Junction which later became Haddiscoe High Level and closed in 1959.

References

Disused railway stations in Norfolk
Former Great Eastern Railway stations
Railway stations in Great Britain opened in 1847
Railway stations in Great Britain closed in 1904
1847 establishments in England